Silwick, a once thriving community in the West Mainland, Shetland, Scotland about three miles from Skeld, is now almost deserted. The area has dramatic cliffs and views.

The Norwegian vessel Ustetind was wrecked on the stony beach here in 1929.

References

Sources
 This article is based on http://shetlopedia.com/Silwick a GFDL wiki.

External links

Canmore - Ward of Silwick site record

Villages in Mainland, Shetland